The 1962 SCCA National Sports Car Championship season was the twelfth season of the Sports Car Club of America's National Sports Car Championship. It began January 28, 1962, and ended September 22, 1962, after thirteen races.

Schedule

 Feature race

Season results
Feature race overall winners in bold.

 C and D Modified were classified together at VIR; the combined class was won by Roger Penske in a DM-class Cooper Monaco.  The highest-finishing CM car was John Todd's Warwick GT350-Buick in 3rd.
 D Modified were classified with C Modified at Bridgehampton.
 C and D Modified were classified together at Lime Rock; the combined class was won by Roger Penske in a DM-class Cooper Monaco.  The highest-finishing CM car was Bob Colombosian's Buick-Mustang in 2nd.
 E Modified were classified with D Modified at Lake Garnett.
 C, D, and E Modified were classified together at Thompson; the combined class was won by Bob Holbert in an EM-class Porsche 718 RS 61.  There were no DM cars; the highest-finishing CM car was Don Adams' Lister-Jaguar in 2nd.

Champions

External links
World Sports Racing Prototypes: SCCA 1962
Racing Sports Cars: SCCA archive
Etceterini: 1962 program covers

SCCA National Sports Car Championship
Scca National Sports Car Championship
 
1962 in American motorsport